Guillermo Jose (Difurnot) Aviles (born January 20, 1993) is a Cuban professional baseball first baseman and leftfielder for Alazanes de Granma in the Cuban National Series.

Aviles played for the Cuba national baseball team at the 2009 World Youth Baseball Championship, 2010 World Junior Baseball Championship, and 2017 World Baseball Classic.

References

External links

1993 births
Living people
Cuban baseball players
Baseball first basemen
Baseball outfielders
Alazanes de Granma players
Sabuesos de Holquin players
2017 World Baseball Classic players
People from Granma Province